Robin Andrew may refer to:
 Robin Andrew (footballer)
 Robin Andrew (bowls)